Harutyun Abrahamyan (born 4 December 1969 in Yerevan, Armenian SSR) is a retired football goalkeeper from Armenia. He obtained a total number of three caps for the national team. Abrahamyan made his debut on 14 October 1992 in a friendly against Moldova (0–0). Apart from playing in his native country he spent one year in Iran with Keshavarz F.C. (1996–97).

National team statistics

References
 

1969 births
Living people
Footballers from Yerevan
Armenian footballers
Armenia international footballers
Association football goalkeepers
Armenian expatriate footballers
Soviet footballers
FC Ararat Yerevan players
Expatriate footballers in Iran
Armenian expatriate sportspeople in Iran
Keshavarz players
Persepolis F.C. non-playing staff
Armenian Premier League players